Sheikh Morsalin (born 25 November 2005) is a Bangladeshi professional footballer who plays as a Central Midfielder for Bangladesh Premier League club Bashundhara Kings.

Club career

Early career
Born in  Faridpur District's, Morsalin started playing local tournaments while still only being a 6th grade student of Adarsh Secondary School of the Charbhadrasan Upazila. In 2014, when trials for the under-12 national football team were held in Charbhadrasan, Morsalin caught the eye of veteran coach Abul Kashem Bholer. However, due to family problems, Morsalin was unable to join the main camp. In 2015, with the help of his uncle Subahan Rahman, Morsalin's career resumed, as the BFF youth football coach Abdur Razzak saw his potential during a trial and included him in the U-13 national team, for a youth tournament held in Malaysia.

In 2016, Morsalin was admitted to Bangladesh Krira Shikkha Protishtan (BKSP), where he continued his education while playing for BKSP's football team in different tournaments, including the 9th Bangladesh Games, in 2020. During the tournament, Morsalin also managed a score a notable brace against Satkhira football team. After the 2019–20 Dhaka Third Division League was delayed due to the COVID-19 pandemic, BKSP arranged Morsalin's move to Alamgir Somaj Kollayan KS, as the club registered to participate in the delayed league season in 2021. During his first year playing domestic football, Morsalin guided his club to promotion as league champions, and also finished the season as top scorer, with 19 goals from 16 matches.

Bashundhara Kings

2021–22 season: Mohammedan SC (loan)
On 25 November 2021, Morsalin joined Bangladesh Premier League club Bashundhara Kings on a three-year contract. While still being a student at BKSP, the initial plan for Morsalin was to train at the club for three years under foreign coaches, and then play in the Premier League. However, club president Imrul Sir sent him on loan to Mohammedan SC, during the mid season transfer window, to give him game time.

On 20 April 2022, Morsalin joined Mohammedan SC on loan. The 16-year-old made his Premier League debut on 22 June 2022, in a Dhaka Derby match, which Mohammedan lost 2–4. In the following game on 27 June, he scored his first goal for the club in a 3–1 win over Sheikh Jamal DC. On 1 July 2022, Morsalin scored a long-range strike against his parent club Bashundhara Kings. His goal earned national recognition and went viral on social media.

Even after securing a regular place at the Mohammedan SC starting eleven, Morsalin expressed his desire to return to his parent club, stating in an interview "I want to focus on coming back to Bashundhara Kings from my loan, be a regular starter there and eventually make it in the Bangladesh national football team. And I've got long-term dreams of playing in a foreign league too if possible in the future."

2022–23 season: Return to Kings
On 5 December 2022, Morsalin made his debut for Bashundhara Kings, during the 2022–23 Independence Cup final against Sheikh Russel KC. After 2–2 draw, Kings won the game on penalties, as Morsalin claimed his first title with the club.

Style of play 
During 2021–22, Morsalin was regarded as the "discovery of the season" by local news outlets. A midfielder who prefers to keep the ball under his control, Morsalin is seen as a versatile player, someone that can play as a striker, or an attacking midfielder, and although the lack of pace, his technical dribbling also makes him an asset on the wings. 

Morsalin revealed that he tries to follow Manchester City midfielder Kevin De Bruyne’s style of play, stating in an interview, that during his time at BKSP he regularly watched the Belgium midfielders videos online. Morsalin also has the ability to score long-range goals, which was evident after his goal against Bashundhara Kings during his debut season in the Bangladesh Premier League. Right-footed Morsalin was mainly used as creative midfielder during his loan spell at Mohammedan SC.

Career statistics

Club

Honours
Alamgir Somaj Kollayan KS
Dhaka Third Division League: 2019–20

Bashundhara Kings
Independence Cup: 2022–23

Individual
 Dhaka Third Division League top scorer: 2019–20

Notes

References

Living people
2005 births
Bangladeshi footballers
Mohammedan SC (Dhaka) players
Bashundhara Kings players
Bangladesh youth international footballers
Association football midfielders
People from Faridpur District
Bangladesh Football Premier League players